Henrik Harlaut (born 14 August 1991) is a Swedish freestyle skier. He was born in Stockholm and moved with his family to Åre at the age of nine.

At the Winter X Games XVII in Aspen, Colorado, Harlaut won the gold medal in Big Air and the silver medal in slopestyle. In the Big Air final, he landed the first-ever "nose butter triple cork 1620" (a series of choreographed flips and spins he had not even tried himself before) and scored a perfect 50 points. He represented Sweden in slopestyle at the 2014 Winter Olympics in Sochi and 2018 Winter Olympics in PyeongChang.

Harlaut is well known for his unusual appearance. At the Winter Olympics in Sochi, he skied with "trousers round his knees and Teenage Mutant Ninja Turtle gloves", losing his trousers in the qualifying round in a "wardrobe malfunction".; as a result, he fell short of a medal and finished sixth. After his run, Harlaut gave the Wu-Tang Clan hand sign to the cameras and declared that "Wu-Tang is for the children", echoing the words spoken by rapper Ol' Dirty Bastard when he interrupted the 1998 Grammy Awards on behalf of the group.

Harlaut is widely regarded as one of the greatest freeskiers of all time.

References

External links
 
 
 
 
 
 

1991 births
Living people
Sportspeople from Stockholm
Swedish male freestyle skiers
Freeskiers
Olympic freestyle skiers of Sweden
X Games athletes
People from Åre Municipality
Freestyle skiers at the 2014 Winter Olympics
Freestyle skiers at the 2018 Winter Olympics
Freestyle skiers at the 2022 Winter Olympics
Medalists at the 2022 Winter Olympics
Olympic medalists in freestyle skiing
Olympic bronze medalists for Sweden
21st-century Swedish people